Al Qurdabia is a Libyan football club based in Sabha which plays in the Libyan Premier League.

Football clubs in Libya
1958 establishments in Libya
Association football clubs established in 1958